Sarti (Sárti) is a village in the Sithonia municipality on the Sithonia peninsula, Greece. It had a population of 1,157 in the census of 2001. 

The name comes from the nearby Ancient Greek settlement of Sarta but the current village was settled after 1923 by Greek refugees from the island of Afissia (now Avsa off the coast of Anatolia) after the Greco-Turkish War and population exchange.

Today, Sarti is a popular tourist destination, especially during the summer when many tourists visit the area's beaches. It is also one of the most commonly used locations for ascending Mount Itamos. Mount Athos is visible from the town's beaches, as well as from the hills overlooking Sarti.

References

Villages in Greece
Populated places in Chalkidiki